Ma Chongchong (born 17 January 1991) is a professional Chinese football player who currently plays as a defender for China League Two side Jinan Xingzhou.

Club career
Ma Chongchong started his football career playing for the various Beijing Guoan youth teams and was loaned to out to Beijing's own satellite team Beijing Guoan Talent, which played as a foreign team in Singapore's S.League in the 2010 league season. He went on to make his senior debut in a league game against Balestier Khalsa FC on 24 March 2010 in a 1–0 defeat. After establishing himself as a regular member of the team he scored his first senior goal on 29 April 2010 in a league game against Woodlands Wellington FC in a 2–1 victory. By the end of the season he returned to Beijing Guoan at the start of the 2011 league season and went on to be promoted into the senior team.
In February 2014, Ma moved to China League One club Chengdu Tiancheng on a one-year loan deal.

In February 2015, Ma transferred to China League One club Jiangxi Liansheng. On 20 January 2017, Ma moved to League Two club Sichuan Longfor. At Sichuan, Ma would go on to establish himself as an integral member of the team and at the end of the 2018 China League Two season go on to aid the club as they went on to win the division title and promotion to the second tier. After three seasons with the club he transferred to newly promoted top tier club Shijiazhuang Ever Bright on 17 July 2020. He would make his debut on 7 August 2020 in a league game against Wuhan Zall that ended in a 2-1 defeat.

International career
Ma Chongchong was called up into the Chinese U-20's squad in 2009 to take part in the 2010 AFC U-19 Championship qualification process, which saw him play in every game while China topped the group. He was included in the squad that took part in the 2010 AFC U-19 Championship, however he had to fight for his place within the team and had to wait until the final group game against Thailand in a 1–1 draw before he saw any playing time within the campaign. His performance was good enough for him to be included in the team that played North Korea in the quarter-finals in a game that China lost 2–0. On 26 March 2011 the Chinese head coach Gao Hongbo decided to promote Ma into the senior team for a friendly against Costa Rica in an experimental team in which Lang Zheng, Jin Jingdao, Lü Peng, Ye Weichao and Zhang Xizhe also made their first appearances in a game that ended in 2–2 draw.

Career statistics
Statistics accurate as of match played 6 January 2023.

Honours

Club
Henan Jianye
China League One: 2013

Sichuan Longfor
China League Two: 2018

References

External links
 
 

1991 births
Living people
Politicians from Luoyang
Hui sportspeople
Chinese footballers
Footballers from Henan
China international footballers
Beijing Guoan F.C. players
Henan Songshan Longmen F.C. players
Chengdu Tiancheng F.C. players
Jiangxi Beidamen F.C. players
Sichuan Longfor F.C. players
Cangzhou Mighty Lions F.C. players
Singapore Premier League players
Chinese Super League players
China League One players
China League Two players
Association football defenders